The Act to Restrain Abuses of Players (1606) was a censorship law passed by the English Parliament, and introduced fines for plays which 'jestingly or profanely' used the names of God or Jesus. Plays written after 1606 avoided such terms as a consequence of the act, and new editions of older plays removed profane words. Some scholars have argued that the Act had an important influence on the revision and publication of the plays of William Shakespeare.

Text of act

This Act is listed as "Anno 3 Jacobi I Cap 21".

(Note that when this Act was passed, a pound in money was the value of a pound weight of silver.)

Impact on dramatic works 

Many scholars and editors have argued that the act had a significant impact on English early modern drama. The need to comply with the act has been used to explain differences in editions of plays published before and after 1606, such as Othello by William Shakespeare and Volpone by Ben Jonson. However, Barbara Mowat has expressed reservations about the extent of the act's influence. She has highlighted the fact that the act only applied to dramatic performances, and thus changes to printed editions of dramatic works may have stemmed from other influences. These influences may have included changing cultural attitudes towards swearing, alterations made by particular scribes (such as Ralph Crane), and the desire to avoid offending particular individuals, such as Sir Henry Herbert, the Master of the Revels from 1624 to 1642.

Notes

References

Further reading

External links 
 Text of the Act (starts at page 678 of the original book)

1606 in English law
1606 in law
Acts of the Parliament of England
Censorship
History of theatre